The Isaac Stern House was a mansion at 858 Fifth Avenue in the Upper East Side neighborhood of Manhattan in New York City.

History 
The home was designed by the firm of Schickel & Ditmars, and it was constructed for the entrepreneur Isaac Stern (d. 1910). He was one of the founders of the Stern Brothers department store and was the father of Robert B. Stearns, who became a prominent financier and co-founded Bear Stearns in 1923. The mansion was later owned by businessman Thomas Fortune Ryan. The house was demolished in 1949 to make way for an apartment building.

References

Further reading 
 

Buildings and structures demolished in 1949
Demolished buildings and structures in Manhattan
Fifth Avenue
Houses in Manhattan
Upper East Side